Åke Grönlund is a male former international table tennis player from Sweden.

He won a bronze medal at the 1977 World Table Tennis Championships in the Swaythling Cup (men's team event) with Stellan Bengtsson, Kjell Johansson, Roger Lagerfeldt and Ulf Thorsell for Sweden.

See also
 List of table tennis players
 List of World Table Tennis Championships medalists

References

Swedish male table tennis players
Living people
World Table Tennis Championships medalists
Year of birth missing (living people)